Saint Vincent Health System, commonly known as simply St. Vincent's, is medical facility located in Erie, Pennsylvania. It is one of the largest employers in the Erie region. The complex features several large buildings, including a heart attack  heart care unit.

References

Hospitals in Pennsylvania
Buildings and structures in Erie, Pennsylvania